Joseph Augustine McGrath (22 September 1911 – 10 June 1968) was an Australian rules footballer who played with Footscray in the Victorian Football League (VFL).

Family
The son of James McGrath, and Mary Ellen McGrath (1872-1930), née Ahern, Joseph Augustine McGrath was born at Yarraville, Victoria on 22 September 1911.

He married Elizabeth Ann "Betty" Heriot (1913-1999), later Mrs. James Bird, on 5 November 1938.

Death
He died at the Footscray Hospital on 10 June 1968.

Notes

References

External links 

Joe McGrath's playing statistics from The VFA Project

1911 births
1968 deaths
Australian rules footballers from Melbourne
Western Bulldogs players
Yarraville Football Club players
People from Yarraville, Victoria